Stéphane Fiset (born June 17, 1970) is a Canadian former professional ice hockey goaltender who played in the National Hockey League and now coaches Thetford Mines in the QCHL.

Playing career
Fiset was drafted in the 2nd round, 24th overall, in the 1988 NHL Entry Draft by the Quebec Nordiques. He played 34 minutes in 6 games in his rookie season with Quebec, playing behind Ron Tugnutt, as well as a host of other goalies who got time that season. Fiset got his first NHL victory on October 29, 1991 against the Winnipeg Jets in Le Colisee de Quebec, by a score of 7–2. Over the next few years, Fiset bounced from the NHL to the Nordiques' minor league affiliates, slowly gaining more and more time in net for the Nordiques. After the 1992–93 season, Ron Hextall was traded to the New York Islanders, opening the door for Fiset to be the starter. Fiset did not disappoint. Within two years, Quebec finished first in the Eastern Conference, during the shortened 1994–95 lockout season.

When Quebec moved to Colorado, the future looked bright for Fiset and the Avalanche. This soon changed. He split time with Jocelyn Thibault in the beginning of the season. However, when Patrick Roy was traded to Colorado from Montreal, Fiset became his backup. Fiset was a part of the 1996 Stanley Cup winning team, but was traded to the Los Angeles Kings a few days later. He was the Kings' first choice starter until the 1999–2000 season, where he split time with Jamie Storr. In the 2000–01 season a knee injury inflicted in a collision with the Mighty Ducks of Anaheim's Dan Bylsma kept him out of 25 games, followed by a second knee injury that kept him out for another 31 games, reducing Fiset to only 7 games played. After the Kings acquired Félix Potvin as insurance, he then effectively lost his starting position and although still hampered by his knees, was traded at the back end of the 2001–02 season to the Montreal Canadiens, but only played two games. With persistent health issues over the previous two years and loss of form Fiset announced his retirement on September 9, 2002.

International play

 
Fiset played in the 1989 Junior World Championships, as well as in 1990. In '89 Canada finished fourth, and Fiset was pulled in a 7–1 drubbing by the Soviet Union after giving up 6 goals. He followed this up in 1990 with a great showing. Team Canada had a gold medal finish and the IIHF Directorate Top Goalie Award. He played in 2 games (and won both of them) during Canada's 1994 gold medal victory.

Goalie masks
Fiset wore one of the most recognizable goalie masks in the history of the NHL. The design is an ice wall reminiscent of the Quebec Nordiques' igloo logo. The fleur-de-lis, the Nordiques alternate logo, was on each ear of the mask. When he played for the Los Angeles Kings, he also donned a memorable mask with the face of King Tut as it appeared on the Pharaoh's tomb.

Career statistics

Regular season and playoffs

International

Awards
QMJHL First All-Star Team (1989),
Canadian Major Junior Goaltender of the Year (1989),
WJC-A All-Star Team (1990)
Named Best Goaltender at WJC-A (1990)
Stanley Cup Champion 1996

References

External links

1970 births
Living people
Canadian ice hockey goaltenders
Colorado Avalanche players
Cornwall Aces players
French Quebecers
Halifax Citadels players
Ice hockey people from Montreal
Los Angeles Kings players
Lowell Lock Monsters players
Manchester Monarchs (AHL) players
Montreal Canadiens players
Quebec Nordiques draft picks
Quebec Nordiques players
Stanley Cup champions
Victoriaville Tigres players